Julia Ettie Crane (May 19, 1855 – June 11, 1923), also known as Julia Etta Crane, was an American music educator, and the first person to set up a school, the Crane School of Music, specifically for the training of public school music teachers. She is among the most important figures in the history of American music education. Crane was a student of Manuel García.

Crane was inducted into the Music Educators Hall of Fame in 1986.

References

External links
Shifflet%20Brian%20R.pdf?acc_num=bgsu1182255855 A History of Ten Influential Women in Music Education 1885-1997
Julia Ettie Crane and her Dream

1855 births
1923 deaths
State University of New York at Potsdam faculty
American music educators
19th-century American educators
20th-century American educators
American women music educators
19th-century American women educators
20th-century American women educators